Blue Creek is a tributary of the Gunnison River in Gunnison County, Colorado. It forms at the confluence of Little Blue Creek and Big Blue Creek adjacent to the intersection of U.S. Highway 50 and Alpine Plateau Road (Gunnison County Road 867) in Blue Creek Canyon.

Course
After it starts at the confluence of little Blue Creek and Big Blue Creek, Blue Creek flows under a bridge on Highway 50, it then flows north along the highway's west side, and then separates from the highway heading north until it eventually empties into Morrow Point Reservoir at the Curecanti Needle.

Other
Blue Creek is one of the two primary stream inflows to Morrow Point Reservoir (the other one is Curecanti Creek). Its mouth lies within the Curecanti National Recreation Area. The portion of the stream within the recreation area has good fly fishing and provides the best chance of catching fish, but access here is only by boat.

See also
List of rivers of Colorado

References

Rivers of Colorado
Rivers of Gunnison County, Colorado
Tributaries of the Colorado River in Colorado